Pittsburg High School may refer to:

Pittsburg High School (California), Pittsburg, California 
Pittsburg High School (Kansas), Pittsburg, Kansas
Pittsburg High School (New Hampshire), Pittsburg, New Hampshire
Pittsburg High School (Oklahoma), Pittsburg, Oklahoma
Pittsburg High School (Texas), Pittsburg, Texas
South Pittsburg High School, South Pittsburg, Tennessee